Ilbert is a surname. Notable people with the surname include:

 Courtenay Ilbert (1841–1924), British lawyer and civil servant 
 Courtenay Adrian Ilbert (1888–1956), civil engineer and collector 
 Peregrine Ilbert (1765–1805), English cleric

See also
 Hilbert (name)